The 2016 Women's Under 18 Australian Championships was the a field hockey tournament held in the Tasmania city of Launceston between 8–17 July 2016.

Queensland 1 won the gold medal by defeating New South Wales State 2–1 in the final. Western Australia won the bronze medal by defeating Victoria Blue 3–0 in the third and fourth place playoff.

Competition format
The tournament is divided into two pools, Pool A and Pool B, consisting of five and six teams respectively, competing in a round-robin format.

At the conclusion of the pool stage, the top two teams of Pools A and B progress through to the semi-finals, where the top placed teams of each pool compete against the second placed team of each pool, with the winners progressing to the final.

The third and fourth placed teams then progress to the fifth to eighth place classification, while the bottom placed teams progress to Pool C (carrying over points) for the ninth to eleventh place classification.

Teams
Unlike other National Australian Championships, teams from New South Wales, Queensland and Victoria are eligible to enter two teams.

  ACT
  NSW State
  NSW Blue
  NT
  QLD 1
  QLD 2
  SA
  TAS
  VIC Blue
  VIC White
  WA

Results

First round

Pool A

Pool B

Second round

Ninth to eleventh place classification

Pool C

Fifth to eighth place classification

Crossover

Seventh and eighth place

Fifth and sixth place

First to fourth place classification

Semi-finals

Third and fourth place

Final

Statistics

Final standings

References

External links

2016
2016 in Australian women's field hockey